Reet, Petite, and Gone is a 1947 American musical race film produced and released by Astor Pictures. It was the first feature film directed by short-subject director William Forest Crouch and stars Louis Jordan and June Richmond.

Plot 

Louis Jarvis Jr. is summoned from his band's radio show to visit his terminally ill father before his father dies. Honey Carter, the daughter of the only woman whom Jarvis Sr. had ever loved, also visits. Jarvis Sr.'s dying wish is that his son marries Honey. He before meeting his son and Honey.

Jarvis Sr.'s shady lawyer Henry Talbot sees a chance to secure a portion of the Jarvis estate for himself by rewriting the will to read that Jarvis Jr. must marry a woman like Talbot's secretary Rusty. Talbot wants to conspire with Rusty to marry and then divorce Jarvis Jr. so that she and Henry will split the estate. Jarvis Jr. is fooled by Talbot's ruse and believes that he must marry soon to avoid the distribution of the estate to charity.

Jarvis Jr. urgently needs the estate money to produce his new stage musical. He does not wish to marry Rusty, but his friend suggests that they cast the show with a lead actress who resembles Rusty. However, Talbot attempts to stop the show by scaring Junior's investors.

Cast 
 Louis Jordan as Schyler Jarvis / Louis Jarvis
 June Richmond as June
 Milton Woods as Sam Adams
 Bea Griffith as Honey Carter / Lovey Linn
 David Bethea as Dolph the butler
 Lorenzo Tucker as Henry Talbot
 Vanita Smythe as Rusty
 Mabel Lee as Mabel
 Dots Johnson as Michaels
 Pat Rainey as Pat Rains
 Rudy Toombs as Hal
 J. Louis Johnson as Schyler Jarvis Sr.
 Joe Lillard as Lt. Jerome

Soundtrack 
 Louis Jordan with His Tympany Five — "Texas and Pacific" (by Jack Wolf Fine)
 Louis Jordan with His Tympany Five — "All for the Love of Lil"
 Bea Griffith and Louis Jordan — "Tonight, Be Tender to Me"
 Pat Rainey, Mabel Lee with Louis Jordan and His Tympany Five — "The Blues Ain't Nothin'" (written by Ida Cox)
 Louis Jordan with His Tympany Five — "The Green Grass Grew all Around" (by William Jerome, arrangement by Louis Jordan)
 June Richmond — "I've Changed Completely"
 Louis Jordan with His Tympany Five — "Wham, Sam! (Dig Them Gams)" (written by Louis Jordan)
 Louis Jordan with His Tympany Five — "I Know What You're Puttin' Down" (written by Louis Jordan)
 Louis Jordan with His Tympany Five — "Let the Good Times Roll" (written by Spo-De-Odee and Fleecie Moore)
 Louis Jordan with His Tympany Five — "Reet, Petite, and Gone" (written by Louis Jordan)
 June Richmond and Louis Jordan with His Tympany Five — "You Got Me Where You Want Me" (writer unknown)
  Jordan with chorus girls — "That Chick's Too Young to Fry" (written by Tommy Edwards and Jimmy Hilliard)
 Louis Jordan — "Ain't That Just Like a Woman?" (written by Fleecie Moore and Claude Demetri)
 Louis Jordan with Bea Griffith — "If It's Love You Want, Baby, That's Me" (written by Sid Robin)

See also
 "Reet Petite", about the song

References

External links 

 
 
 
 
 

1947 films
1947 musical films
American black-and-white films
Race films
American musical drama films
1940s English-language films
1940s American films